The 1973 Skate Canada International was held in Calgary, Alberta on October 25–28. Medals were awarded in the disciplines of men's singles, ladies' singles, and ice dancing.

Results

Men

Ladies

Ice dancing

References

External links
 Canadian participants

1973 in figure skating
Skate Canada International
1973 in Canadian sports 
1973 in Alberta